The 1971–72 Yorkshire Football League was the 46th season in the history of the Yorkshire Football League, a football competition in England.

Division One

Division One featured 12 clubs which competed in the previous season, along with four new clubs, promoted from Division Two:
Emley
North Ferriby United
Scarborough reserves
Thackley

League table

Map

Division Two

Division Two featured nine clubs which competed in the previous season, along with six new clubs.
Clubs relegated from Division One:
Barton Town
Wombwell Sporting Association
Clubs promoted from Division Three:
Brook Sports
Guiseley
Leeds & Carnegie College
Stocksbridge Works

League table

Map

Division Three

Division Three featured ten clubs which competed in the previous season, along with four new clubs:
 Blackburn Welfare
 Retford Town reserves
 Woolley Miners Welfare
 Worsbrough Bridge Miners Welfare Athletic, joined from the Sheffield Association League

League table

Map

League Cup

Final

References

1971–72 in English football leagues
Yorkshire Football League